Tracing Lines and Silent Cry are the double a-side singles from Feeder, and was released on 25 August 2008.

Both songs, 'Tracing Lines' and 'Silent Cry' are taken from their sixth album, Silent Cry. The single was originally meant to be just "Tracing Lines", released on 11 August 2008 on CD and vinyl editions. However "Silent Cry" was later added along with the announcement that it would be a download-only single. Feeder's fans slated this due to being no physical release or any new material worth collecting.

Track listing

Bundle 1

 Tracing Lines (single edit)
 Tracing Lines (live from XFM's All-Day Breakfast)
 Somewhere to Call Your Own
 Silent Cry

Bundle 2
 Tracing Lines
 Tracing Lines (Live from XFM's All-Day Breakfast)
 Silent Cry

Bundle 3
 Tracing Lines (The Crypt sessions)
 Silent Cry (The Crypt sessions)
 Tracing Lines (Instrumental)
 Silent Cry (Instrumental)

References

2008 singles
Feeder songs
The Echo Label singles